The Football League play-offs for the 1991–92 season were held in May 1992, with the finals taking place at Wembley Stadium. The play-off semi-finals were also played over two legs and were contested by the teams who finished in 3rd, 4th, 5th and 6th  place in the Football League Second Division, the 4th, 5th, 6th and 7th placed teams in the Football League Third Division and the 3rd, 4th, 5th and 6th place teams in the Football League Fourth Division table. The winners of the semi-finals progressed through to the finals, with the winner of these matches gaining promotion for the following season.

Second Division

The Second Division season finished with Ipswich Town as champions and Middlesbrough as runners-up gaining automatic promotion to the new FA Premier League. This left Derby County and Blackburn Rovers, the two biggest spending teams in the division, facing each other in the one playoff semi-final, while the other was contested between Leicester City and a Cambridge United side who successful style of long ball play had taken them to the brink of a unique third successive promotion, while Leicester had made their first serious promotion challenge since being relegated from the First Division five years earlier.

Blackburn won the first leg 4-2 at Ewood Park, and Derby's 2-1 win in the return leg at the Baseball Ground was not enough to prevent the Lancastrian side from going through to the final. In the other semi-final, Cambridge held Leicester to a 1-1 draw at the Abbey Stadium before losing the return leg 5-0 at Filbert Street.

The final - and a place in the new Premier League - was settled by a single goal as Blackburn beat Leicester thanks to a penalty by former Leicester striker Mike Newell, securing Blackburn's return to the top flight of English football after 26 years away.

Semi-finals
First leg

Second leg

Blackburn Rovers won 5–4 on aggregate.

Leicester City won 6–1 on aggregate.

Final

Third Division

Huddersfield Town's fourth season in the Third Division since relegation in 1988 saw their most serious promotion challenge in that time, but a third-place finish meant that they had to navigate a playoff semi-final clash with a Peterborough United side in the hunt for a second successive promotion. Peterborough went through, while Stockport County overcame Stoke City in the other semi-final to set up a playoff final clash between two teams who had both been promoted from the Fourth Division only a year earlier. Peterborough won the final 2-1 to reach the second tier of English football for the first time in their history; they were still among the newest ten clubs in the Football League having joined in 1960.

Semi-finals
First leg

Second leg

Stockport County won 2–1 on aggregate.

Peterborough United won 4–3 on aggregate.

Final

Fourth Division

A year after losing the Fourth Division playoff final on penalties to Torquay United, Blackpool returned to Wembley for a showdown with Scunthorpe United and this time were the winning side as they triumphed on penalties after a 1-1 draw. The Seasiders had overcome league newcomers Barnet in their semi-final, with Scunthorpe overcoming Crewe Alexandra in the other semi-final.

Semi-finals
First leg

Second leg

Blackpool won 2–1 on aggregate.

Scunthorpe United won 4–2 on aggregate.

Final

External links
Football League website

 
English Football League play-offs